This is a list of lighthouses in Seychelles.

Lighthouses

See also
 Lists of lighthouses and lightvessels

References

External links

Seychelles

Lighthouses
Lighthouses